Ad extirpanda ("To eradicate"; named for its Latin incipit) was a papal bull promulgated on Wednesday, May 15, 1252 by Pope Innocent IV which authorized in limited and defined circumstances the use of torture by the Inquisition as a tool for interrogation.

Context
The bull was issued in the wake of the murder of the papal inquisitor of Lombardy, St. Peter of Verona, who was killed by a conspiracy of Cathar sympathizers on 6 April 1252. It was addressed to the heads of state or rulers, ministers and citizens established in the states and districts of Lombardy, Riviera di Romagnola (in Emilia-Romagna), and Marchia Tervisina in the Veneto. Judicial torture had become a common practice in the 11th and 12th centuries, following the rediscovery of Roman law. By 1252, it was regarded as an established method by secular tribunals.

Content
The bull argued that as heretics are "murderers of souls as well as robbers of God’s sacraments and of the Christian faith", they are "to be coerced—as are thieves and bandits—into confessing their errors and accusing others, although one must stop short of danger to life or limb."  The following parameters were placed on the use of torture:
that it did not cause loss of life or limb (citra membri diminutionem et mortis periculum) 
that it was used only once
that the Inquisitor deemed the evidence against the accused to be virtually certain.

The bull conceded to the State a portion of the property to be confiscated from convicted heretics. The State in return assumed the burden of carrying out the penalty. The relevant portion of the bull read: "When those adjudged guilty of heresy have been given up to the civil power by the bishop or his representative, or the Inquisition, the podestà or chief magistrate of the city shall take them at once, and shall, within five days at the most, execute the laws made against them."

References

External links
Ad Extirpanda, English translation

1252 works
13th-century papal bulls
Documents of Pope Innocent IV
Inquisition
Torture